The Baojun 560 is a compact crossover SUV produced by SAIC-GM-Wuling through the Baojun brand.

Overview
The Baojun 560 was powered by a 1.8 liter inline-four petrol engine code named LJ479QNE2 mated to a 5-speed manual transmission, a 6-speed manual transmission, or a 5-speed semi-automatic transmission. A 1.5 liter Daewoo S-TEC inline-four turbo petrol engine was added in 2017 mated to a 6-speed dual-clutch transmission producing 150 hp(110 kW).

The Baojun 560 was launched on the Chinese market in July 2015. Price ranges from 80,000 to 100,000 yuan, and was phased out by 2018 when the Baojun 530 replaced the 560 model.

References

External links 

560
Front-wheel-drive vehicles
Cars introduced in 2015
Cars of China
Crossover sport utility vehicles
Compact sport utility vehicles